Cottey Creek (also called Cottey Branch) is a stream in Knox County in the U.S. state of Missouri. It is a tributary of Troublesome Creek.

The confluence is 2.5 miles southwest of Knox City and 6.5 miles southeast of Edina.

Cottey Creek has the name of the local Cottey family.

See also
List of rivers of Missouri

References

Rivers of Knox County, Missouri
Rivers of Missouri